is a Japanese actor, singer, and model.

He has released three single CDs: "Itsudemo Boku wa" (いつでも僕は, Anytime I am...), "Hitorigoto" (ヒ・ト・リ・ゴ・ト, Soliloquy), "New Morning".

He also portrayed the character Shinji Mimura in the controversial film Battle Royale, along with this he has also portrayed the character Gion Toji in the video game Ryū ga Gotoku Kenzan! in both voice and likeness that was captured using facial scanning technology. He narrated the 2015 film Junk Story, which documents the life of musician hide.

Filmography

Dramas
Shokuinshitsu (1997)
Change (1998)
Shounen Suspense "Scary E-mail" (1998)
Kurenai (1998)
Osorubeshi! Otonashi Karensan (1998) – guest
Psychometrer Eiji 2 (1999)
A Season of Sentiment (1999)
Futago Tantei (1999)
Kasouken no Onna 2 (2000) – guest
Summer Snow (2000) – gang member (ep. 2,3,6,& 7)
Cinderella wa Nemuranai (2000)
Kizudarake no Love Song (2001)
Fighting Girl (2001) (ep. 1)
Cherry (2001)
Onmyouji (2001)
Rookie (2001) (ep. 6)
Jidan Kosho Jinnai Tamako Ura File (2001) (SP1)
Tengoku ni Ichiban Chikai Otoko (2001) (ep. 1)
Otousan as Hide-chan (2002)
Tokyo Niwatsuki Ikkodate (2002)
Koi Seyo Otome (2002)
Gokusen (2002) – Kurosaki (ep. 9)
Kisarazu Cat's Eye (2002) – Kizashi Sasaki, nicknamed Ani
Manhattan Love Story (2003) – Gunma Shinobu
Stand Up!! (2003)
Shin Yonigeya Honpo (2003) (ep. 9)
Densetsu no Madam (2003)
Ikebukuro West Gate Park Special (2003) – cameo
Hontou ni Atta Kowai Hanashi (2004) – Tsuneichi Yuya
Fuufu (2004) – Yamaguchi Ren
Wakaba (2004) – Tani Jyunichi
Ichiban Taisetsu na Date (2004) – Oota Kenji (ep. 1,3, & 4)
Division 1 Runner's High (2004) – Komine Ryugo
Fire Boys (2004) – Amakazu Shiro
Chotto Matte Kami-sama (2004)
Meitantei Akafuji Takashi (2005)
Kikujiro to Saki 2 (2005) – Kitano Takeshi
Tiger & Dragon (2005) – Nakatani Ginjiro
Teppan Shoujo Akane!! (2006) – Ichijo Shinta
Kekkon Dekinai Otoko (2006) – Murakami Eiji
Koi no Kara Sawagi Drama Special Love Stories IV (2007)
Hatachi no Koibito (2007) – Kawamura Yukio
Ganges Gawa de Butterfly (2007) – Shingo
Kikujiro to Saki 3 (2007) – Kitano Takeshi
Tokkyū Tanaka 3 Go (2007) – Kei Hanagata
Shoni Kyumei (2008) – Kariya Shunsuke
6-jikan go ni Kimi wa Shinu (2008) – Yamaha Keishi
Kansahojin (2008) – Miyazaki Kenji
Mirai Koshi Meguru (2008) – Akira (ep. 4)
Miracle Voice (2008) – Toriyama Takashi
Tokyo Dogs (Fuji TV, 2009, ep7) – Yano Ryosuke
Teioh (2009) – Sakaki Ryo
Samayoi Zakura (2009) – Kanogawa Yukihiko
Magerarenai Onna (NTV, 2010) – Sakamoto Masato
Taira no Kiyomori (NHK, 2012) – Tōkurō
Gunshi Kanbei (NHK, 2014) – Gotō Matabei
Keiji Shichinin (TV Asahi, 2015 - ) - Aoyama Arata, from season 2
Kono Yo ni Tayasui Shigoto wa Nai  (NHK, 2017) – Kasumi's boyfriend
 Godaime San'yūtei Enraku (2019, BS-NTV) – San'yūtei Rakutarō

Films
Battle Royale – Shinji Mimura (2000)
Godzilla, Mothra and King Ghidorah: Giant Monsters All-Out Attack (2001)
Hikari (2001)
Aoi Haru (2002)
Kaminari Hashiru Natsu (2003)
Kisarazu Cat's Eye: Nihon Series – "ANI"/Sasaki Kizashi (2003)
Kuzenni mo Saiyakuna Shounen (2003)
Robot Contest (2003)
Rockers (2003)
Princess Blade (2003)
Koibumi Hiyori ~ Ikarusu no Koibitotachi – Sasaki Kenji (2004)
Shinku (2005)
About Love (Part 3) Nomura Shuhei (2005)
Fugaku Hyakkei (2006)
Kisarazu Cat's Eye: World Series as "ANI"/Sasaki Kizashi (2006)
Nada Sōsō (2006)
Taki 183 (2006)
Midnight Sun (Taiyō no Uta) (2006)
Smile Seiya no Kiseki (2007, cameo)
Sono Toki wa Kare ni Yoroshiku / That Time I Said Hi to My Boyfriend (2007)
Enma (2007)
The Longest Night In Shanghai (2007)
Ikigami (2008)
Yesterdays (2008)
Tsurikichi Sanpei (2009)
Outrage (2010)
Wachigaiya Itosato (2019) – Serizawa Kamo
 Sadako (2019)
 High & Low: The Worst (2019) – Kōichi "Parko" Haruyama
 Come On, Kiss Me Again! (2020)
 His Bad Blood (2020)
 Tell Me (2022) – I.N.A
 The Three Young-Men in Midnight: The Movie (2022) – Mickey
 Kyoto Camaro Detective (2022)

Japanese dub
Top Gun (2005 DVD edition) – LT Pete "Maverick" Mitchell (Tom Cruise)

References

External links
 Official site (Sun Music)
 

Living people
People from Tokyo
1982 births
Japanese male film actors
Japanese male television actors
Male actors from Tokyo
20th-century Japanese male actors
21st-century Japanese male actors
21st-century Japanese singers
21st-century Japanese male singers